Dendraster ashleyi is an extinct species of sand dollars of the family Dendrasteridae. Fossil of this species have been found in the Pliocene of California (United States), about 5 Mya. They reach a diameter of about 3.5 cm.

References
 ABDUG University of Aberdeen, Geological Collections
 Organism Names

External links
 Trifoss
 Books Geology

Dendrasteridae
Pliocene animals
Fossils of the United States